This list of Lui magazine cover models is a catalog of models and celebrities who have appeared on the cover of French men's magazine Lui.

External links
 Lui magazine covers on Models.com

Lists of models
Lists of people by magazine appearance